Josée Laval (born Josette Pierrette Laval;  – 9 January 1992) was an important figure of the régime de Vichy. She was the daughter of Pierre Laval and the spouse of René de Chambrun.

Biography

Family 
She was born as Josette Pierrette Laval in Paris, the only daughter of Pierre Laval (1883–1945) and Jeanne Claussat (1888–1959), daughter of the Radical-Socialist mayor of Châteldon (1881-1891) Joseph Claussat (1846-1910) and sister of the député and mayor of Châteldon (1908-1925) Joseph Claussat (1874–1925). 

During her childhood, she developed a great admiration towards her father.

Marriage and WWII 
On 19 August 1935, Josée Laval married Count René de Chambrun, the son of Aldebert de Chambrun and Clara Eleanor Longworth, in the basilica Sainte-Clotilde in Paris. Among the witnesses were the general Pershing and Alice Roosevelt Longworth (the wife of Nicholas Longworth, René's maternal uncle). 

The couple became friends with lots of famous personalities, including Louise de Vilmorin, Marie-Laure de Noailles, Florence Gould, André Fraigneau, Coco Chanel, Stanislas and Armand de La Rochefoucauld or Henri Sauguet. 

During the war, Josée Laval used the important role of her father to lead a mundane and expensive existence. She then divided her life between Paris and the family castle of Châteldon. 

Friend Paul Morand, she is nicknamed "Chérie-chérie" by the latter. She also maintains a salon frequented by many figures of the Collaboration such as Xavier Vallat, René Bousquet, Fernand de Brinon and Otto Abetz.

At the Liberation, she hid in the outskirts of Paris with her husband. Later, she tried in vain to clear Pierre Laval whose she wishes a quick release; however, she could not prevent his execution on 15 October 1945 in the Fresnes Prison. Marked by this ordeal, she preferred to forget the war.

Paintings stolen from Jewish collectors between 1939 and 1945 
In the 1950s, the heirs of Adolphe Schloss discovered at the Chambrun's one of the 333 master paintings of the Northern schools that had been part of their father's collection, hidden by them in 1939 at the Château de Chambon (19), where on 10 April 1943 it was confiscated by four members of the Carlingue (French Gestapo) accompanied by the German police lieutenant Hess, and then, despite an intervention by the Vichy government with a view to a sale, finally delivered to the Germans on 10 August 1943 by decision of Abel Bonnard. On 11 June 1974 at the Hôtel des Ventes de Versailles, a painting by Braque, Le guéridon au paquet de tabac (1930), put up for sale by Josée de Chambrun, was seized in his presence by Paul Rosenberg, who had come expressly from New-York, many of whose paintings had similarly been confiscated from Floirac in September 1940.

Although the origin of ownership of these two valuable works by the Chambruns is not known, it may have something to do with the relations between Pierre Laval and Otto Abetz, who organized spoliations from Jewish collectors or French administrations as early as July 1940.

Last years 
In 1955, Josée undertook with her husband the renovation of the Château de la Grange-Bléneau, the last residence of the marquis de La Fayette. In the course of the work, the many archives that were unearthed led to the creation of the Fondation Josée-et-René-de-Chambrun, which was recognized as being of public utility on 19 October 1959.

In addition to the conservation of the Château de la Grange-Bléneau and the château de Châteldon, the foundation militates for the rehabilitation of Pierre Laval.

In 2017, the foundation will lend works and souvenirs of La Fayette to the exhibition La Fayette La traversée d'une vie at the Musée Hèbre in Rochefort-sur-Mer (17).

Josée Laval, Countess of Chambrun, died in January 1992, at the age of 80. She is buried in the Montparnasse Cemetery in Paris.

Posterity 
A television documentary entitled Les Carnets de Josée Laval lis devoted to her in 2018 describes especially her life during the Occupation. The critic from the newspaper Le Monde wrote in this regard: : 'Each time we read [an excerpt from her notebooks], an immense feeling of shame invades us, so much so that the denial of Nazi horrors agitates this past that does not pass'.

Alexandre Jardin (born in 1965), who knew her as a child, also evokes her in Des gens très bien (2011), where Paul Morand also appears.

Bibliography

Notes 

1911 births
1992 deaths
20th-century French people
Pierre Laval